In geometry, the heptagrammic-order heptagonal tiling is a regular star-tiling of the hyperbolic plane. It has Schläfli symbol of {7,7/2}. The vertex figure heptagrams are {7/2}, . The heptagonal faces overlap with density 3.

Related tilings
It has the same vertex arrangement as the regular order-7 triangular tiling, {3,7}. The full set of edges coincide with the edges of a heptakis heptagonal tiling.

It is related to a Kepler-Poinsot polyhedron, the great dodecahedron, {5,5/2}, which is polyhedron and a density-3 regular star-tiling on the sphere (resembling a regular icosahedron in this state, similarly to this tessellation resembling the order-7 triangular tiling):

References
 John H. Conway, Heidi Burgiel, Chaim Goodman-Strass, The Symmetries of Things 2008,  (Chapter 19, The Hyperbolic Archimedean Tessellations)

External links 

Heptagonal tilings
Hyperbolic tilings
Isogonal tilings
Isohedral tilings
Regular tilings
Heptagrammic-order tilings